Craig Hall may refer to:
Craig Hall (politician), American state representative in Utah
Craig Hall (actor) (born 1974), New Zealand actor
Craig Hall (rugby league, born 1977), Australian rugby league player
Craig Hall (dancer) (born c. 1981), American ballet master and retired ballet dancer
Craig Hall (rugby league, born 1988), English rugby league player